Gaudichaudia is a genus of flowering plants belonging to the family Malpighiaceae.

The type species is Gaudichaudia cynanchoides .

It is found as a native in the countries of Colombia, Costa Rica, El Salvador, Guatemala, Honduras, Mexico, Nicaragua and Venezuela.

The genus name of Gaudichaudia is in honour of Charles Gaudichaud-Beaupré (1789–1854), a French botanist. It was first described and published in (F.W.H.von Humboldt, A.J.A.Bonpland & C.S.Kunth edited), Nov. Gen. Sp. Vol.5 on page 156 in 1822.

Description
Mostly scandent (vine-like) or trailing shrubs, with opposite leaves which are entire (have a smooth edge) and are petiolate (have a leaf stalk). The calyx (sepals of a flower) has 8 or 10 glands. The petals are yellow and dentate (edges are teethed) and the fruit (or seed capsule) has 3 samaras (A dry, indehiscent fruit with its wall expanded into a wing).

Known species
According to Kew;

References

External links
  Images of Gaudichaudia albida 

Malpighiaceae
Malpighiaceae genera
Plants described in 1822
Flora of South America